The following is a list of Cal Poly Pomona Broncos in the NFL Draft: that is, those players who played college football at California State Polytechnic University, Pomona and were drafted by NFL teams.

Key

Selections

References

Cal Poly Pomona

Cal Poly Pomona Broncos in the NFL Draft
Cal Poly Pomona Broncos NFL Draft